Modeligo GAA is a Gaelic Athletic Association club in County Waterford in the Republic of Ireland. 
Modeligo's most notable successes are winning the Waterford County Junior Football Championship in 1996 defeating St Mollerans & the County Junior Hurling Championship in 2008 defeating Fenor. In 2014, the club won its second county Junior Hurling title and also won the Munster title with a victory over Cork champions Castlemartyr, on a scoreline of 5–12 to 0–14 at Mallow. The club colours are Green & White.

Modeligo GAA honours
 Munster Junior Club Hurling Championship Winners 2014
 Waterford Junior Football Championship Winners	(2) 1996, 2015	
 West Waterford Junior Football Championship Winners (6)	1986, 1990, 1992, 1996, 2007, 2015
 West Waterford Intermediate  Football Championship Winners (2) 2018, 2019
 Waterford Junior Hurling Championship Winners  2008, 2014	
 West Waterford Junior Hurling Championship Winners (2)	2008, 2014
 West Waterford Junior ‘B’ Hurling Championship Winners (3) 1986, 1991, 1998			
 West Waterford Intermediate Hurling League Winners (2) 2014, 2015
 West Waterford Intermediate Hurling Championship Winners (1) 2015

References

Gaelic games clubs in County Waterford
Hurling clubs in County Waterford
Gaelic football clubs in County Waterford
Gaelic Athletic Association clubs established in 1986